A localized list or local list is a technique used under systems of party-list proportional representation to determine which party candidates are elected from the party list. Local lists differ from  open lists or closed lists. As with open lists, local lists allow the electorate to vote for individual candidates, but that preference is expressed through local or district level election processes. Closed lists do not allow voters to express such a preference. Voters vote only for the party.

Voting in local list systems takes place at the district level, where each party is represented by a single candidate. In this, the system resembles first-past-the-post or other single-winner systems. However, the candidate with the largest number of votes in a district is not necessarily the one that is elected. This is because of the proportionality requirement of the system.

To ensure that each party receives a proportional share of seats relative to its share of the popular vote, the first step in ballot counting is to add up the votes going to each party either overall (at-large) or by  multi-member constituencies. The results by party are then used to divide the number of seats proportionately among the different parties. The party list is composed of the candidates running in each district.

Once the number of seats won by a party is known, that party's candidates with the highest percentages of votes in their district are the ones elected, until all the seats corresponding to that party have been filled.

This system affords voters a way of voting for individual candidates. However, the system is designed to ensure proportionality, so the candidate with the highest popular vote in a single local constituency may not be elected (because his or her party-mates in other constituencies may have a higher voter share) and candidates with fewer votes can be elected (because they are the best candidates in their party's list). It is possible for more than one candidate to be elected in a single district, or for no candidate to be elected.

Localized lists are used in Italy for provincial elections and were used for Senatorial elections from 1948 to 2001. They are also used in a Mixed-member proportional representation variant in the Landtag of Baden-Württemberg (the first-place candidate in each district is guaranteed a seat, and each constituency has more seats than it has districts to ensure proportionality)

Examples

How this mechanism operates can best be understood with some numerical examples. The examples below are for a hypothetical four-member constituency containing four equal-sized districts. The constituency is represented by four elected members, although elected members are understood to represent the whole constituency, not just the individual districts. The two examples are virtually identical, except that in the second example, the number of votes secured by the Blue Party is slightly higher in District 4 relative to District 3. Seat allocation by party is determined using the Hare quota, largest remainder method.

Example 1 

Four seats must be filled. The Red Party received 1670 votes, Blues 910, Yellows 890 and Greens 530. The Red Party thus wins two seats, while the Blue and Yellow Parties win one seat each. Party candidates John, James, Hughes and Joshua, shown in bold, are elected. Note that District 3 elects two candidates, while District 4 elects none, but in principle this is not a problem, because all winners represent their party for the whole constituency, not the individual district.

Example 2 

Four seats must be filled. The Red Party received 1650 votes, Blues 930, Yellows 890 and Greens 530. As before, the Red Party wins two seats while the Blue and Yellow Parties win one seat each. Party candidates John, James, Hughes and Mary are elected. In this case, the front-runner, Anne, loses her race in favour of the runner-up, but again this is in principle not a problem, because Mary represents the Blue Party for the constituency as a whole and was the strongest of the Blue Party candidates.

See also
 List of democracy and elections-related topics

References

Party-list proportional representation